4 is a number, numeral, and digit.

4 or four may also refer to:

Months and years 
 AD 4, the fourth year of the AD era
 4 BC, the fourth year before the AD era 
 1904 
 2004
 The month of April

Places
Four, Isère, a French commune
4th arrondissement of Paris, an administrative district of Paris, France

Transport
 BMW 4 Series
Renault 4
4 (New York City Subway service), service schedule

Film, television and radio 
 4 (2005 film), a 2005 film directed by Ilya Khrzhanovsky
 4 (2007 film), a 2007 film directed by Tim Slade
 Four (2011 film), a 2011 film directed by John Langridge
 Four (2012 film), a 2012 film directed by Joshua Sanchez
 Four (TV series), an Indian soap opera
 Number Four (Battlestar Galactica), or Simon, is a Cylon model in the re-imagined Battlestar Galactica series.
 Numbuh 4, a fictional character in Codename: Kids Next Door
 Channel 4, a British television channel
 BBC Radio 4, a British radio station
 Four (New Zealand TV channel), a New Zealand television channel
 News 4 New York, a flagship newscast broadcast on WNBC-TV in New York City
 I Am Number Four, a novel, adapted into a 2011 film of the same name
 The Four: Battle For Stardom, a 2018 American music reality series

Music 
 #4, American musician a.k.a. James Root
 Four Four, an Australian independent record label

Albums
 4, a 2010 album by The Bamboos, 2010
 4 (Beyoncé album), 2011
 4 (Dungen album), 2008
 4 (Foreigner album), 1981
 4 (Fourplay album), 1998
 4 (Gerling album), 2006
 4 (Johan album), 2009
 4 (Kumbia Kings album), 2003
 4 (Lead album), 2006
 #4 (Ling tosite Sigure album), 2005
 4 (Lipps Inc. album), 1983
 4 (Los Hermanos album), 2005
 4 (Slash album), 2022
 4 (Supersilent album), 1998
 4 (The Red Jumpsuit Apparatus album), 2014
 4 (Whigfield album), 2002
 :4 (Galliano album), 1996
 #4 (Suburban Kids with Biblical Names EP), 2009
 4 (Hunter EP), 2009
 4 (Matisse EP), 2003
 Four (Bleu album), 2010
 Four (Bloc Party album), 2012
 Four (Blues Traveler album), 1994 
 Four (Charlotte Church EP), 2014
 Four (Fair Warning album), 2000
 Four! (Hampton Hawes album), 1958
 Four (Joe Henderson album), 1968
 Four (One Direction album), 2014
 Four (Seaweed album), 1993
 Four (Acts of Love), by Mick Harvey, 2013
 Fourth (album),  by Soft Machine, 1971
 No. 4 (album), by Stone Temple Pilots, 1999
 4: John Paul George Ringo, a 2014 compilation EP featuring songs by John Lennon, Paul McCartney, George Harrison and Ringo Starr

Songs
 "4", by Aphex Twin from Richard D. James Album, 1996 
 "Four", by Lit from A Place in the Sun, 1999
 "Song 4", by Babymetal from Babymetal, 2014
 "Four" (composition), composition credited to Miles Davis which he first recorded in 1954

Other uses 
 4, occasionally used in acronyms to mean the word "for"
 4 (axiom), an axiom in modal logic
 Four (drink), a beverage
 Four, scoring ("boundary") situation in cricket
 FOUR score, a method of quantifying coma
 Fours (Enneagram of Personality), a psychological type of the Enneagram of Personality
 Four (comics), fictional characters in Planetary
 Four, the nickname of the fictional character Tobias Eaton in the Divergent series of books

Similar glyphs 
 , symbol for Jupiter
 Ч, Che (Cyrillic), a letter of the Cyrillic alphabet
 Ɥ, an IPA symbol for the labialized palatal approximant
 Կ and Վ, letters of the Armenian alphabet

See also 
 IV (disambiguation)
 04 (disambiguation)
 Coxed four and coxless four, types of competitive rowing boat
 Dufour/Defour/Du Four/De Four (disambiguation)
 Fourth (disambiguation)
 Fantastic Four
 Gang of Four (disambiguation)
 Number Four (disambiguation)
 The Four (disambiguation)
 Type 4 (disambiguation)
 Year Four